Law dis-Order (literally "Legal Strongman") is a 2016 Hong Kong television legal drama produced by Marco Law for TVB, starring Alex Fong, Liu Kai-chi, Ali Lee and Mandy Wong as the main leads. It premiered on Hong Kong's TVB Jade and Malaysia's Astro On Demand on September 19, 2016 airing Monday through Sunday during its 9:30-10:30 pm timeslot and concluding October 16, 2016 with a total of 28 episodes.

Law dis-Order centred around the office politics of a prestigious Hong Kong law firm. Liu Kai-chi played KC Lau (劉謹昌) and Alex Fong played Kent Cheung (張強), both are powerful attorneys struggling to become the main authority at the law firm they both work at.

In memorial of Liu Kai-chi, this drama aired again from 31 March 2021 in the midnight time slot.

Synopsis
As the co-founder of the Chinese law firm Donald & Co., Charles Cheuk (Lau Dan), has been a chairman of its committee for many years. Though he had promised his managing partner KC Lau (Liu Kai-chi) that he would step down, Charles hires the money-minded lawyer Kent Cheung (Alex Fong) as a new partner for the firm, hoping that he would be able to counterbalance KC’s growing obsession for authority.

KC had built up great influence in his years with Donald & Co. His associates include the abled lawyers Duncan Yam (Raymond Cho) and Martha Fong (Mandy Wong). With Patricia Lee (Florence Kwok) and Nick Chau (Matthew Ho) as Kent’s only strongsuits, KC assumed he had the upper edge in their game of power.

However, a traffic accident catches KC off guard, and Kent takes advantage of the situation. He gets himself a lucrative offer from Charles, who promotes Kent to senior partner. During this time, Kent re-encounters assistant solicitor Hazel Cheuk (Ali Lee), and they develop a close mentor-student friendship.

Feeling his power ebbing away, KC becomes a ticking time bomb, ready to explode at any moment. But while fighting for control, a toothless tiger comes out from under the radar, ready to seek revenge.

Cast and characters

Donald & Co. Law firm
Lau Dan as Charles Cheuk Kai-yiu (卓繼堯)
Chung King-fai as Henry Ching Yat-hong (程日匡)
Liu Kai-chi as KC Lau Kan-cheung (劉謹昌)
Alex Fong Chung-shun as Kent Cheung Keung (張強)
Ali Lee as Hazel Cheuk Yi-chung (卓宜中)
Mandy Wong as Martha Fong Ning (方寧)
Raymond Cho as Duncan Yam Wai-leung (任偉樑)
Florence Kwok as Patricia Lee Siu-wah (李少樺)
Matthew Ho as Nick Chow Lik-hang (周力行)
Kelly Cheung as Libby Poon Hei-man (潘希文)
Chan Wing-chun as KK Tsang Ka-kit (曾家健)
Henry Yu as  YT Leung Yiu-tin (梁耀天)
Koo Koon-chung as Don Sum Lap-ho (沈立豪)
Yeewan Ho as Sandy Tse Hong-yee (謝康兒)
Jones Lee as Ben Kwong chung-yiu (鄺忠耀)
Mandy Lam as Elsa Law Pui-yu (羅貝如)
Ng Kwong-lee as Ivan Chiu Chi-pong (招志邦)
Daniel Chau as Jason Tong Ka-kit (湯家健)
Osanna Chiu as Helen Sin Wai-shan (冼慧珊)
Doris Chow as Zita Ha Ting (夏婷)
Athena Ng as Ceci Kwok Sze-wan (郭思韻)
Kitterick Yiu as Sam Au Chi-sum (歐智琛)
Joey Mak as Eva Shek Wing-yin (石穎妍)

Extended cast
Becky Lee as Mary Wong Wing-lam (汪穎琳)
Ram Chiang as Michael Yip Ho-tin (葉浩天)
Griselda Yeung as Danielle Lok Sze-wai (駱思慧)

Soundtrack
The main opening theme song "Choice of Justice" (公義的抉擇) was sung by Hubert Wu, composed by Alan Cheung and lyrics by Hayes Yeung. A sub theme song named "Can You See" performed by Kayee Tam, and also composed by Dominic Chu, with lyrics by Wayne James was played during the closing credits on some episodes.

Track listing

Development and production
In October 2015, Alex Fong announced that he would take a break from Mainland China projects to film a drama for TVB as he was personally invited by producer Marco Law to film the drama and looked forward to working with Liu Kai-chi.
Ir was announced in early November 2016 that veteran Hong Kong actor Liu Kai-chi would be returning to TVB after a long absence with the television station to film a drama. Liu's last TVB drama was 2007s The Winter Melon Tale (大冬瓜).
The costume fitting ceremony was held on November 30, 2015 12:30 pm at Tseung Kwan O TVB City Studio One Common Room.
The blessing ceremony was held on January 4, 2016.
Filming took place from December 2015 till March 2016, entirely on location in Hong Kong.

Viewership ratings

October 15, 2016: No episode broadcast.

Awards

International broadcast
  - 8TV (Malaysia)

References

External links
Law dis-Order Official TVB website 

TVB dramas
Hong Kong television series
2016 Hong Kong television series debuts
2016 Hong Kong television series endings
2010s Hong Kong television series